Choctaw is an unincorporated community in Van Buren County, Arkansas, United States. Choctaw has a post office with ZIP code 72028.

Notable people
Bill Bradford, Major League Baseball pitcher
Glenna Sue Kidd, All-American Girls Professional Baseball League pitcher

References

 
Unincorporated communities in Van Buren County, Arkansas
Unincorporated communities in Arkansas
Arkansas placenames of Native American origin